Noccaea montana, the alpine pennycress, is a flowering plant in the family Brassicaceae. It is found in the Western United States. It has a basal rosette out of which grows "one or several short, unbranched stems that have small, arrow-shaped leaves and end in dense racemes of tiny white flowers."

Distribution and habitat
In the United States, Noccaea montana is found almost completely to the west of a line joining Texas, Colorado, Wyoming, and Montana.

References

External links

Brassicaceae
Flora of the Western United States
Plants described in 1753
Taxa named by Carl Linnaeus
Flora without expected TNC conservation status